Guido Guerrini (born 12 January 1976 in Arezzo, Italy) is an Italian rally driver and co-driver. In 2016 and 2017 he won the FIA Alternative Energies Cup in the co-drivers' category. Before that, he collected five second places, as a co-driver in 2015 and as a driver from 2011 to 2014 and in 2020. Since 2016 he is based in Kazan, Russian Federation.

Career

Driver 

Guerrini debuted as a driver in the FIA Alternative Energies Cup, reserved for hybrid and endothermic vehicles, in 2009, together with co-driver Andrea Gnaldi Coleschi. In 2010, Guerrini obtained 3rd place in the Italian championship standings and 5th place in the world championship won by the French driver Raymond Durand.

The following year, together with co-driver Emanuele Calchetti on an Alfa Romeo MiTo, he finished second both in the world and in the Italian championships, won by Massimo Liverani, and repeated the same result in 2012 and in 2013, when with Emanuele Calchetti he won the Hi-Tech Ecomobility Rally in Athens. In 2014, together with Isabelle Barciulli, Guerrini gained another second place in the World Cup and third place in the Italian championship.

In 2019 Guerrini participated as a driver in the FIA E-Rally Regularity Cup with Emanuele Calchetti on an Audi e-tron, winning the manufacturers' championship and obtaining the third place in the drivers' standings. In 2020 together with Francesca Olivoni he obtained the second place in the overall standings of a FIA ERRC season which was reduced because of Covid and won to races of the Italian Championship with Emanuele Calchetti.

Co-driver 

In the 2015 season Guerrini took part in the championships as a co-driver, together with driver Nicola Ventura on an Abarth 500, finishing at second place in the world championship after Thierry Benchetrit and winning the Italian championship ex-aequo with Valeria Strada.

In the 2016 season Ventura and Guerrini on a Renault Zoe passed to the category reserved for purely electric cars and they won the World Cup. In 2017 Guerrini won the FIA Electric and New Energies Championship, which joined both the previous hybrid and purely electric categories.

Travels 

Guido Guerrini is also a car traveler, the first person to go from Europe to China covering the whole route by a gas-fuelled car.

The project, called Torino-Pechino, la macchina della pace (Turin-Beijing, the peace machine), was organized in 2008: overall, Guerrini and  Andrea Gnaldi Coleschi (born 27 October 1978 in Arezzo, Italy), The trip started on 6 July 2008 and passed through 17 countries to finish on 21 September 2008, and used  LPG for fuel for  95% of the journey. The project is described in the 2008 book Aregolavanti (Always Forward).

In winter 2011, together with Emanuele Calchetti, he traveled from Rome to Volgograd with a gas-fuelled Gonow pick-up, crossing Eastern Europe, Moldova, Transnistria, and Ukraine. This experience originated the travel book Via Stalingrado (Stalingrad Street, 2011).

Among his many other car travels, Guerrini reached the extremes of Europe (North Cape, Istanbul, Gibraltar), and completed an expedition to the Caspian Sea through the Caucasian republics in 2010, another travel to Volgograd in December 2013 and January 2014 on an Iveco Daily with a mixed system methane-diesel, the Arezzo-Chernobyl on a methane-propelled Peugeot Expert in the following winter and the Milan-Astana on an LPG Seat Altea in 2016.

In June 2018 he started a new "Turin-Beijing" project on a diesel-methane propelled Toyota Hilux. It is described in the travel book Eurasia.

Results in the FIA AEC

Driver

Co-driver

Sources

Bibliography
 Andrea Gnaldi Coleschi, Guido Guerrini, Nicola Dini, Aregovalanti, Città di Castello, 2008, 160 pp.
 Emanuele Calchetti, Guido Guerrini, Via Stalingrado, Petruzzi Editore, Città di Castello, 2011, 216 pp. .
 Guido Guerrini, Eurasia. Dall'Atlantico al Pacifico con il gas naturale, Sansepolcro, 2018. .

Travelers
FIA E-Rally Regularity Cup drivers
Italian rally drivers
Living people
1976 births
Sportspeople from Arezzo
Naturalised citizens of Russia